Samuel Cooper (August 5, 1897 – death unknown) was an American Negro league pitcher in the 1920s. 

A native of Brooklyn, New York, Cooper made his Negro leagues debut in 1923 with the Baltimore Black Sox. He went on to play for the Harrisburg Giants, and finished his career in 1929 with the Bacharach Giants.

References

External links
 and Seamheads

1897 births
Year of death missing
Place of death missing
Bacharach Giants players
Baltimore Black Sox players
Harrisburg Giants players
Baseball pitchers